Jordan Simpson may refer to:
 Jordan Simpson (Australian soccer) (born 1985)
 Jordan Simpson (footballer, born 1998), English footballer